Tinglof Peninsula is an ice-covered peninsula, 10 nautical miles (18 km) long, between Henry and Wagoner Inlets on the north side of Thurston Island. It was delineated from aerial photographs taken by U.S. Navy Operation Highjump in December 1946. It was named by the Advisory Committee on Antarctic Names (US-ACAN) for Iver (Ivor) Tinglof, tractor mechanic of the Second Byrd Antarctic Expedition in 1933–35, who, at Little America, built the first heavy cargo sleds for use in the Antarctic.

Smith Cliff is a rock cliff midway along the ice-covered northern shore of the peninsula. It was photographed by the Eastern Group of Operation Highjump and later named by US-ACAN after aviation radioman William F. Smith, an aircrewman from the operation.

Maps
 Thurston Island – Jones Mountains. 1:500000 Antarctica Sketch Map. US Geological Survey, 1967.
 Antarctic Digital Database (ADD). Scale 1:250000 topographic map of Antarctica. Scientific Committee on Antarctic Research (SCAR). Since 1993, regularly upgraded and updated.

References 

Peninsulas of Ellsworth Land